Mirko Novosel (born 30 June 1938) is a Croatian former professional basketball coach and player.

Novosel coached some of the greatest players in former Yugoslavia and Croatia, such as Croatian Hall of Fame players Krešimir Ćosić and Dražen Petrović. He was enshrined into the Naismith Memorial Basketball Hall of Fame, as a coach, on 7 September 2007. He was inducted into the FIBA Hall of Fame, as a coach, in 2010.

Playing career
Novosel played club basketball, from 1952 to 1966, with Lokomotiva Zagreb.

Coaching career
Novosel coached Cibona to two Yugoslav League titles, seven Yugoslav Cups, and the two European Champions Cup titles in 1985 and 1986, when he was named the European Coach of the Year.

National team coaching career 
As the head coach, Novosel led the senior men's Yugoslav national team to the silver medal at the 1974 FIBA World Championship, the silver medal at the 1976 Montreal Summer Olympics, and the bronze medal at the 1984 Los Angeles Summer Olympics.

Novosel was also the head coach of the senior men's Croatia national team, leading them to the bronze medal at the 1993 European Championship.

Career achievements

Club career
 FIBA European Champions Cup: 1 (with Cibona: 1984–85)
 FIBA European Cup Winners' Cup (Saporta Cup): 2 (with Cibona: 1981–82, 1986–87)
 FIBA European Champions Cup – top 6 (with Cibona: 1982–83)
 FIBA Korać Cup – finalist (with Cibona: 1979–80, 1987–88)
 Yugoslav League: 2 (with Cibona: 1981–82, 1983–84)
 Yugoslav Cup: 7 (with Cibona: 1968–69 (under the name Lokomotiva), 1979–80, 1980–81, 1981–82, 1982–83, 1984–85, 1987–88)

See also 
 List of FIBA EuroBasket winning head coaches
 List of EuroLeague-winning head coaches

External links
Basketball Hall of Fame page on Novosel
FIBA Hall of Fame Profile

1938 births
Living people
Basketball referees
Croatian basketball coaches
Croatian expatriate basketball people in Italy
Croatian men's basketball players
EuroLeague-winning coaches
FIBA EuroBasket-winning coaches
FIBA Hall of Fame inductees
KK Cibona coaches
Naismith Memorial Basketball Hall of Fame inductees
Yugoslav basketball coaches
Yugoslav men's basketball players